Heybat-e Olya (also Romanized as Heybat-e ‘Olyā; also known as Heybat-e Bālā) is a village in the Angut-e Gharbi Rural District, Anguti District, Germi County, Ardabil Province, Iran. At the 2006 census, its population was 38 and had 8 families.

References 

Towns and villages in Germi County